Sonegaon (Nipani) is a census town in Nagpur district in the Indian state of Maharashtra.

Demographics
 India census, Sonegaon (Nipani) had a population of 11,804. Males constitute 53% of the population and females 47%. Sonegaon (Nipani) has an average literacy rate of 82%, higher than the national average of 59.5%: male literacy is 87%, and female literacy is 77%. In Sonegaon (Nipani), 9% of the population is under 6 years of age.

References

Cities and towns in Nagpur district